The Douze is the right source river of the Midouze, in the Landes, in the southwest of France.

Geography 
The Douze rises in Armagnac, in the Gers département. It joins the Midou in Mont-de-Marsan to constitute the Midouze, a tributary of the Adour.

Départements and towns 

 Gers: Peyrusse-Grande, Espas, Manciet, Cazaubon.
 Landes: Labastide-d'Armagnac, Saint Justin, Roquefort.

Main tributaries 

 (R) Estampon, in Roquefort.
 (R) Gouaneyre.

References

Rivers of France
Rivers of Gers
Rivers of Landes (department)
Rivers of Nouvelle-Aquitaine
Rivers of Occitania (administrative region)